Histoires de is a greatest hits album by French singer Mylène Farmer, released on 4 December 2020. It is her third compilation, after Les Mots (2001) and 2001.2011 (2011).

Track listing

Charts

Weekly charts

Year-end charts

Certifications

References

2020 greatest hits albums
Mylène Farmer compilation albums
Polydor Records compilation albums
French-language compilation albums
Albums produced by Laurent Boutonnat